Robert McFaul Campbell (13 September 1956 – 15 November 2016) was a Northern Irish international footballer who played as a centre forward.

Club career

Born in Belfast, Campbell started his career at Aston Villa, making his professional debut in April 1974. He failed to establish himself in the first team, making 10 league appearances for the club before being sold to Huddersfield Town in May 1975. He joined Sheffield United in 1977, but left the club after just one season. He briefly returned to Huddersfield Town for a second spell before signing for Halifax Town.

In December 1979, he joined Bradford City. He made over 300 appearances for the club, and became the club's all-time leading goalscorer with a total of 143 goals. Whilst at Bradford he won promotion from Division Four in the 1981–82 season and the Football League Division Three title in 1984–85, the latter of which paled into insignificance when 56 spectators were killed in a stand fire while playing Lincoln City in the final game of the season.

Campbell left Bradford in 1986 and joined Wigan Athletic, where he finished his playing career. In 1986–87, Campbell finished as Wigan's top goal scorer with 20 goals, helping the club to reach the quarter final of the FA Cup for the first time in its history. He was the club's top scorer again with a further 16 goals in the 1987–88 season, most notably scoring a hat trick against local rivals Bolton Wanderers at Burnden Park in the first round of the League Cup.

International career
In 1975, Campbell was selected to play for the Northern Ireland youth team at the European Under-18 Championship in Switzerland, but was sent home, along with teammate Bertie McMinn, after being involved in a car crash. The Irish FA subsequently banned both players from representing the country at all levels. After several attempts to overturn the decision, including a petition from supporters, the ban was eventually lifted in 1981.

In April 1982, Campbell was included in the Northern Ireland squad for the upcoming British Home Championship, and was subsequently capped twice during the tournament. He was also selected by his country for the 1982 FIFA World Cup later that year, but failed to make an appearance.

Post-retirement
After retiring from football in 1988, Campbell worked as a steward at a working men's club in Huddersfield. In 2013, he was dismissed by the club after he and his wife were accused of fraud, but the charges were dropped after the case was taken to court.

On 15 November 2016, Campbell was found dead after hanging himself in his garage.

Career statistics

Source:

References

External links
 
  Northern Ireland's Footballing Greats
 Bobby Campbell hat trick for Wigan Athletic v Bolton Wanderers on YouTube

1956 births
2016 deaths
Association footballers from Belfast
Ulster Scots people
Association footballers from Northern Ireland
Association football forwards
Northern Ireland international footballers
1982 FIFA World Cup players
Aston Villa F.C. players
Halifax Town A.F.C. players
Huddersfield Town A.F.C. players
Sheffield United F.C. players
Bradford City A.F.C. players
Derby County F.C. players
Wigan Athletic F.C. players
Expatriate association footballers from Northern Ireland
Vancouver Whitecaps (1974–1984) players
Brisbane City FC players
English Football League players
North American Soccer League (1968–1984) players
Expatriate soccer players in Canada
Expatriate soccer players in Australia
Suicides by hanging in England